Rastak Music Group is an Iranian contemporary folk music ensemble that was formed as an experimental music group in 1997. Rastak seeks to collect, record and interpret Persian folk music for a global audience.

About Rastak 
Rastak incorporates Persian language, Iranian culture and history as well as merging traditional instruments and forms with contemporary rhythms. Rastak has done extensive research into Persian folk music both academically and in practice. They have been focused for the past two decades on the sound of Iranian folklore and diverse cultures; resulting in five albums, five singles and numerous concert tours in Iran and overseas.

Rastak has appeared on several international music festivals and has held many concerts in Iran, England, Austria, Germany, France, Italy, Spain, The Netherlands, Sweden, United States, Canada, Australia, India, Japan, Malaysia, Chile, Poland, Turkey, Georgia, Belgium, Oman, Belarus, Kazakhstan, Bangladesh, Iraq, United Arab Emirates among others.

Members

Musicians 
 Siamak Sepehri: Band Director, Tar Player
 Farzad Moradi: Vocalist and multi instrumentalist
 Behzad Moradi: Vocalist and percussionist
 Dina Doosti: Kamancheh and Kamancheh alto player
 Majid Poosti: Percussionist
 Akbar Esmaeilipour: Tar, Oud, Setar
 Sahar Rashidi: Qanun

Management 
 Behzad Pournaghi: Marketing/Band Manager
 Mehdi Farshchi: Executive Manager

Guest Artists

Previous Members 
Omid Mostafavi, Hamed Bolandhemmat, Yasaman Najmeddin, Parisa Inanloo, Yavar Ahmadifar, Mohammad Mazhari, Piran Mohajeri, Sepehr Saadati, Sara Naderi, Kaveh Sarvarian, Yaser Navazandeh, Farzad Khorshidsavar, Negar Ezazi, Saba Jamali, Reza Abedia, Sahar Ebrahim, Nima Niktab, Sara Ahmadi, Hosna Parsa, Danoosh Asadpour, Bita Ghasemi

Instruments

Strings 
Tar, Qanun, Oud, Kamancheh, Santur, Kamancheh alto, Bam Tar, Tanbur, Dotar, Ghoppoz, Divan, Gheyhak, Rubab, Azeri Tar, Tanboorak, Gheychak Bass, Double Bass, Cello, Guitar, Bass Guitar

Percussions 
Tombak, Daf, Dholak, Damam, Naqareh, Desar Koten, Zarb, Zarb Timpo, Dayereh, Bandir, Dayereh Zangi, Dhol, Dom Dom, Kaser, Pipeh, Kasooreh, Tas, Halab, Darbuka, Cajón, Tambourine, Cymbal, Senjak

Wind Instruments 
Sorna, Nayanban, Balaban, Dozaleh, Nay Jofti, Qoshmeh, Gharaney, Labak, Neylabak, Laleva, Ney, Donaley, Karnay

Albums and Singles

Rangvareha-ye-Kohan (Ancient Hues) – Audio, 2007 
Also known as Ancient Hues is Rastak’s first album and has 12 audio tracks. Iran is a vast country with a long history where the wide range of ethnic minorities comprising one nation, is illustrative of congeniality, culture interaction and strong bonds among Iranians. The pieces of this collection as part of  a rich spiritual legacy, belong to a number of these ethnicities; however, they have been given a rather fair air.

Tracks 

 Hoor (Sun) – Bases on the ancient mode of Tanbur
 Soon-o-Soog (Festivity & Mourning) – An adaptation of Lorestan & Kermanshah music
 Hejran (Far & Away) – Unaccompanied Kamacheh
 Paeezeh (Autumn) – Based on a Kurdish local melody
 Eshragh (Intuition) – Unaccompanied Oud
 Souda (Passion) – Inspired by a melody from Khorasan
 Kavir (Desert) – A trio for 2 Tars and 1 Dutar
 Kajal (Deer) – Based on a local tune from Kurdistan
 Shoopeh (Glow Worm) – Instrumental piece in Mazandarani
 Haraee – Based on modes from Mazandaran music
 Kooran (River) – Instrumental music, incorporating music from Mazandaran and Balochistan
 Banoor (Bride) – Based on Balochi "sout" mode

Hame-ye Aghvam-e Man (All My Homeland People) – Audio and Video, 2010  
Since long ago, Iran has always been a cradle for different folks who managed to save and nurture their bases of cultures alongside the rich culture of their ancient homeland. One symbol of this cultural variety is the vast range of folkloric music which is the heritage of their past. "All My Homeland People"  is Rastak's effort to retell these ballads. It is Rastak's hope to play a small role in recreating folk ballads and introducing the deep roots and rich past of Persian culture to the world.

Tracks 

 Baroon – Lori
 Raana – Gilaki
 Gal Gal – Azeri
 Leyla – Khorasan
 Souzaleh – Kurdi
 Balal – Bakhiari
 Marochan – Balochi

Sorna-ye Nowruz / Video album, 2013  
Rastak’s 3rd album Sornay-e Nowruz. It comprises 6 audio and video tracks from Bushehr, Fars, Mazandaran, Kormanj, Baluchestan, Azerbaijan, Gilan and kurdistan.

Tracks 

 Heleh Mali – Bushehr
 Yar – Fars Province
 Lareh - Mazandaran
 Allah Khaneh – Kormanji
 Hal Haleh – Qashqai
 Sorna-ye Nowruz – Bakhtiari, Khorasan, Mazandarani, Azeri, Balochi, Gilaki and Kurdi

Mian-e Khorshidha-ye Hamisheh (Among Eternal Suns) – Audio & Video album, 2016  
Is Rastak's interpretation of the music of Iran's varied cultures- "Sun" that steadily shine over and across this land generating music as well as ideas. Rastak endeavors is to make use of these endless treasures,  and feels indebted to them. “Among Etrnal Suns” includes 10 audio and video tracks from Kerman, Khuzestan, Hormozgan, Kurdestan, Gars, Baluchestan and Azerbaijan.

Tracks 

 Sakineh – Kerman
 Biu Barimesh – Khuzestan
 Ey Yaar – Hormozgan
 Havaar
 Botorai – Kurdistan
 Vasoonak – Fars
 Zahirook
 Allah Mani Barag – Blochestan
 Sanin Yadegarin – Azerbaijan
 Lezgi

Bahar – Audio & Video album, 2018 
New experiences about new arrangements and the use of guitar and cello in combination with Iranian musical instruments. Celebrating Spring, Rastak's latest album includes folk songs from different parts of Iran, with folk lyrics in different languages and dialects. All these tracks have praise of Spring and the Persian New Year as their central theme, hence the name of the album: Bahar (Spring)

Tracks 

 Mandir – Bakhtiari
 Shekoufeh – Fars
 Nowruz – Hormozgan
 Gol-e-Pamchal – Guilan
 Wahar – Kurdistan
 Gol Poune – Farsi
 Lala Lar – Azerbaijan

Borderless at Home – Audio Singles 2019–2020  
In this project Rastak is working on the music of Iran neighboring countries to be a messenger of peace while depicting the beauty of Middle Eastern music and culture. The idea of this album was born due to the positive feedbacks in overseas performances.

Tracks 

 Laily Jan -Dari
 Hyo Hayo Hiye – Arabic
 Asum En Te  – Armenian
 Kuchalar – Azeri
 Kara Uzum Habbasi – Turkish
 Laylo – Kurmanji

Dance With Rastak – Audio and  Video Album 2021 
Dance With Rastak, reflects the diversity of Iranian culture and its folklore music. The album is our 6th album which will be released in two audio and video editions and comprises folk songs from ethnicities such as Azerbaijan, Dezful, Kerman, Kurdistan, Khurasan and Shiraz.

Tracks  

 Owina (Based on an Azeri song)
 Ow Bordom (Based on North Khuzestan music)
 Faatelo (Based on a song from Kerman)
 Kamarey (Derived from Kurdish music)
 Shadoomad  (Derived from Khorasan music)
 Asemoon (Based on a song from Shiraz)

Sombre Sky 
Sombre Sky (AKA Aseman-e-kaboud), (Persian: آسمان کبود) is a single recorded in Istanbul and published in 2022. It is based on an old song performed by Iradj Mahdian.

References 

Persian classical music groups
Iranian musical groups